Capital & Class is a quarterly peer-reviewed academic journal covering the fields of politics and economics, especially concerning Marxism and critical theories like feminism, environmentalism, poststructuralism, along with other radical and intellectual movements. The journal's editorial board is elected by the members of the Conference of Socialist Economists at their annual meeting. The managing editor is Owen Worth (University of Limerick). It was established in 1977 and is currently published by SAGE Publications on behalf of the Conference of Socialist Economists.

Abstracting and indexing 
Capital and Class is abstracted and indexed in:
 Academic Search Complete
 Academic Search Premier
 ABI/INFORM
 EBSCO: EconLit
 International Bibliography of the Social Sciences
 Scopus
 SocINDEX
 Wilson OmniFile

External links 
 

Publications established in 1977
SAGE Publishing academic journals
English-language journals
Economics journals
Triannual journals
Marxist journals